Sir Henry Clay (9 May 1883 – 30 July 1954) was a British economist and Warden of Nuffield College, Oxford.

Clay was educated at the Bradford Grammar School and University College, Oxford.

Between 1917 and 1919 Clay worked as a temporary civil servant at the Ministry of Labour, where he worked closely with Harold Butler. From 1919 and 1921 he was a fellow of New College, Oxford. In 1922 he became the Stanley Jevons Professor of Political Economy at the University of Manchester; in 1927 he became Professor of Social Economics at the University of Manchester. Between 1930 and 1944 he worked as an economic adviser to the Bank of England.

In 1944, he became Warden of Nuffield College, Oxford, in succession to Harold Butler, and retired in 1949. The foundation stone of Nuffield College was laid in 1949, shortly before his retirement as Warden. He was elected to the American Academy of Arts and Sciences in 1939. He was knighted in 1946. In 1947, he was elected to the American Philosophical Society.

References

External links 

 

1883 births
1954 deaths
British economists
Wardens of Nuffield College, Oxford
People educated at Bradford Grammar School
Alumni of University College, Oxford
Fellows of New College, Oxford
Academics of the Victoria University of Manchester
Knights Bachelor
People associated with the Bank of England
20th-century English businesspeople
Members of the American Philosophical Society